Shamrock was the fifth single released by the Japanese rock band, Uverworld. It was released on August 2, 2006. The limited pressing of the single has a DVD containing the video digest of their live performance from their Timeless Tour @ Shibuya-AX. It reached number six on the Oricon charts and sold approximately 97,091 copies.  It was used as the drama Dance Drill's theme song.

The full version of the ringtone has reached platinum status in February 2010 since its download started on August 2, 2006.

Track listing

References

2006 singles
Uverworld songs
Japanese television drama theme songs
2006 songs
Gr8! Records singles